Rasmus Stjerne Hansen (born 26 May 1988 in Hvidovre) is a retired Danish curler. He is a former world junior champion and current Danish champion. He curls out of the Hvidovre Curling Club.

Career
Stjerne has participated in five World Junior Championships. He played as third for Kenneth Jørgensen in 2004 and 2005, finishing outside of the playoffs in both years. He then skipped his own team at the World Juniors in 2006, 2007, and 2008, finishing fifth, fourth, and seventh, respectively. Then, in the 2009 World Junior Curling Championships, Stjerne and his team made the playoffs as the second-ranked team. They were defeated by Canada in the page 1 vs. 2 game, but rebounded with a win over the United States in the semifinal and defeated Canada in the final to win the gold medal.

Stjerne skipped a team at the 2010 European Curling Championships, and led his team to the playoffs. Stjerne defeated Germany's Andy Kapp in the page 3 vs. 4 game and then edged Switzerland's Christof Schwaller to play Norway in the gold medal game. Norway's Thomas Ulsrud won a close game over Stjerne, leaving him the silver medal. He was defeated by his father, Tommy Stjerne, in a tournament that decided the Danish representatives at the 2011 Ford World Men's Curling Championship, and went with his father's team as their coach. Stjerne returned the next year at the 2011 European Curling Championships and again made the playoffs, but lost in an extra end in the page 3 vs. 4 game to the Czech Republic's Jiri Snítil, relegating him to the bronze medal game. However, Stjerne defeated Snítil in nine ends on his second try, earning the bronze medal.

Stjerne represented Denmark at the 2012 World Men's Curling Championship in Basel, where Denmark finished outside of the playoffs. Later that year, he led Denmark to a 4th-place finish at the 2012 European Curling Championships. He followed this up by placing 4th at the 2013 Ford World Men's Curling Championship, and again finishing 4th at the 2013 European Curling Championships. Stjerne skipped Denmark at the 2014 Winter Olympics, leading the team to a 6th-place finish with a 4-5 record.

In his return to Basel to represent Denmark at the 2016 World Men's Curling Championship, Stjerne led his rink to a silver medal, Denmark's best world championship result ever. Denmark finished the round robin in a three-way tie for second with Japan and the United States, each with 8-3 records, but Denmark was given the 2nd place spot in the Page playoff by having defeated both Japan and the United States in the round robin. Stjerne lost the 1 vs. 2 game to Canada 5-3, then defeated the US 9-3 in the semifinal. In the gold medal game, Canadian champion Kevin Koe again defeated the Danish rink by a score of 5-3.

Personal life
Stjerne is currently a student. His education is in Business Administration from the Copenhagen Business School. Stjerne's father, Tommy Stjerne, is an accomplished curler and a former world bronze medalist.

References

External links
 
 Olympic profile

Danish male curlers
1988 births
Living people
Curlers at the 2014 Winter Olympics
Olympic curlers of Denmark
Continental Cup of Curling participants
Curlers at the 2018 Winter Olympics
People from Hvidovre Municipality
Sportspeople from the Capital Region of Denmark
21st-century Danish people